Tu Mere Agal Bagal Hai is a comedy television series which aired on SAB TV from 7 July 2014 to 26 September 2014. It stars  Alok Nath, Supriya Pathak, Apara Mehta and Rajesh Kumar.

Cast

Main
Rajesh Kumar as Laal Singh
 Shweta Gulati as Kesari
 Ami Trivedi as Khandvi
 Sameer Shah as Khakhra
 Sugandha Mishra as Pillavakandi
 Manoj Goyal as Anu
 Dhaval as Pillu
 Abhishek Avasthi as Mallik
 Sukesh Anand as Sher Singh

Recurring
 Alok Nath as Jagat Babuji
 Apara Mehta as Basundi
 Supriya Pathak as Ganga Mausi
 Monica Castelino as Victoria Bai
 Salim Zaidi a Various characters
 Mahika Sharma as performer
 Ashiesh Roy as Various characters

References 

Frames Production series
Indian comedy television series
2014 Indian television series debuts
Sony SAB original programming